Gregorio Verdi was an Argentine actor. He starred in the acclaimed Silver Condor-winning 1943 film Juvenilia. He also appeared in La otra y yo (1942), Puertos de ensueño  (1942) and Captain Poison (1943).

References

External links
 

Argentine male film actors
Year of birth missing
Year of death missing